Three Men Army is a 1995 Indian Malayalam-language comedy-drama film directed by Nissar, starring Dileep and Devayani in the lead roles.

Plot

Three roommates, Madhukumar, Benny Kurien and Surendran have optimistic dreams. Surendran fantasizes becoming a movie star like Rajinikanth. Madhukumar, who aspires to be a police officer, in-turn wants to marry his lover Shubha. Shubha is the daughter of K. R. G. Menon. Benny Kurien is a con artist, who needs to support his family. The trio confronts a bad guy named Thomas, who kidnaps Shubha and Benny's girlfriend. With the help of a former police officer Rajesh, the three men fight back.

Cast

Soundtrack

References

External links
 

1990s Malayalam-language films
1995 action comedy films
Indian action comedy films
1995 films
Films directed by Nissar